Villiers-le-Bâcle is a commune in the Essonne department in Île-de-France in northern France.

Inhabitants of Villiers-le-Bâcle are known as Villebaclais.

The painter Tsugouharu Foujita is buried in the commune's cemetery.

See also
Communes of the Essonne department

References

External links

Official website 

Mayors of Essonne Association 

Communes of Essonne